Ampera may refer to:

Indonesia 
Ampera is generally an abbreviation for Amanat Penderitaan Rakyat [Mandate of People's Suffering], a now-rarely used colloquial name for the preamble of the Constitution of Indonesia.

 Ampera Bridge, a bridge in Palembang, South Sumatera named after the abbreviation
 Ampera LRT station, a station of Palembang LRT named after the bridge
 Ampera Cabinet, an Indonesian Cabinet from July 1966 until October 1967 named after the abbreviation
 Revised Ampera Cabinet, an Indonesian Cabinet from October 1967 until June 1968 named after the previous cabinet

Transportation 

 Opel Ampera, a plug-in hybrid automobile produced by General Motors
 Opel Ampera-e, a battery electric automobile produced by General Motors

See also 

 Amperage, an electric current
 Ampere (disambiguation)
 Ampara (disambiguation)